In the Commonwealth realms, a Royal Style and Titles Act or a Royal Titles Act is an act of parliament passed in the relevant jurisdiction that defines the sovereign's formal title in that jurisdiction. The most significant of these acts is the United Kingdom's Royal and Parliamentary Titles Act 1927, which recognised the creation of the Irish Free State, a development that necessitated a change in King George V's title.

In December 1952, the governments of Commonwealth realms agreed that each realm would adopt its own royal titles.

Antigua and Barbuda
The Royal Titles Act, 1981, of the Parliament of Antigua and Barbuda gave Parliament's assent to the adoption of a separate title by the monarch in relation to Antigua and Barbuda. Since the Governor-General's proclamation dated 11 February 1982, the monarch's official title has been, "Charles the Third, by the Grace of God, King of Antigua and Barbuda and of His other Realms and Territories, Head of the Commonwealth".

Australia

In Australia, the monarch's title has been, since 9 September 2022, "Charles the Third, by the Grace of God King of Australia and His other Realms and Territories, Head of the Commonwealth". Typically, though, the sovereign is styled King of Australia and is addressed as such when in Australia or performing duties on behalf of Australia abroad. The sovereign is the only member of the royal family to have a title established through Australian law; other members are accorded a title via letters patent in the United Kingdom.

Canada

The Canadian Parliament passed in 1947 the Royal Style and Titles Act and an order-in-council was issued on 22 June the following year to remove the term Emperor of India from the sovereign's Canadian title. In 1953, the legislature passed the Royal Style and Titles Act, consenting to the issuance of a royal proclamation changing the royal style and titles, which was done on 28 May, declaring the official styles in Canada to be, in English, "Elizabeth the Second, by the Grace of God of the United Kingdom, Canada, and Her other Realms and Territories, Queen, Head of the Commonwealth, Defender of the Faith", and, in French, "Elizabeth Deux, par la grâce de Dieu Reine du Royaume-Uni, du Canada, et de ses autres royaumes et territoires, Chef du Commonwealth, Défenseur de la Foi".

In the accession proclamation for King Charles III, the royal title used was, in English, "Charles the Third, by the Grace of God of the United Kingdom, Canada, and His other Realms and Territories, King, Head of the Commonwealth, Defender of the Faith", and, in French, "Charles Trois, par la Grâce de Dieu, Roi du Royaume-Uni, du Canada, et de ses autres royaumes et territoires, Chef du Commonwealth, Défenseur de la Foi".

Ceylon
The Royal Titles Act 1953 of the Parliament of Ceylon granted the Ceylonese monarch a separate title for use in Ceylon. Under the act, the title and style of the Ceylonese monarch was: "Elizabeth the Second, Queen of Ceylon and of Her other Realms and Territories, Head of the Commonwealth".

The Gambia
The Royal Style and Titles Act 1965 of the Parliament of Gambia granted the monarch a separate title for use in the Gambia, in her role as Queen of the Gambia. Under the Act, the title and style of the Gambian monarch was: "Elizabeth the Second, Queen of The Gambia and all Her other Realms and Territories, Head of the Commonwealth".

Ghana
The Royal Style and Titles Act 1957 of the Parliament of Ghana granted the monarch a separate title for use in Ghana. Under the Act, the title and style of the Ghanaian monarch was: "Elizabeth the Second, Queen of Ghana and of Her other Realms and Territories, Head of the Commonwealth".

New Zealand
One of the first post-Second World War examples of New Zealand's status as an independent monarchy was the alteration of the monarch's title by the Royal Titles Act 1953. For the first time, the official New Zealand title mentioned New Zealand separately from the United Kingdom and the other realms, to highlight the monarch's role specifically as Sovereign of New Zealand, as well as the shared aspect of the Crown throughout the realms; the title created from this act was: Elizabeth II, by the Grace of God of the United Kingdom, New Zealand and Her Other Realms and Territories Queen, Head of the Commonwealth, Defender of the Faith. Since the passage of the Royal Titles Act 1974, the monarch's title in New Zealand has been Elizabeth the Second, by the Grace of God Queen of New Zealand and Her Other Realms and Territories, Head of the Commonwealth, Defender of the Faith.

The King's title as given in the 2022 Proclamation of accession of Charles III is: "King Charles III, By the Grace of God King of New Zealand and of His Other Realms and Territories, Head of the Commonwealth, Defender of the Faith"

Although the King's New Zealand title includes the phrase 'Defender of the Faith', neither the King nor the governor-general has any religious role in New Zealand; there has never been an established church in the country. This is one of the key differences from the King's role in England, where he is Supreme Governor of the Church of England.

Nigeria
The Royal Style and Titles Act 1961 of the Parliament of Nigeria granted the monarch a separate title for use in Nigeria. Under the Act, the title and style of the Ghanaian monarch was: "Elizabeth the Second, Queen of Nigeria and of Her other Realms and Territories, Head of the Commonwealth".

An introductory part of the style, By the Grace of God, was nevertheless added in official use.

Sierra Leone
The Royal Style and Titles Act 1961 of the Sierra Leonean Parliament granted the monarch a separate title in her role as Queen of Sierra Leone. Under the Act, the official title of the Sierra Leonean monarch became: "Elizabeth the Second, Queen of Sierra Leone and of Her Other Realms and Territories, Head of the Commonwealth".

Solomon Islands
The Royal Style and Titles Act 2013 of the National Parliament of Solomon Islands granted the monarch a separate title in her role as Queen of Solomon Islands. The new style was already in non-statutory use since 1988, when it was included in the Ministry of Foreign Affairs and External Trade Manual.

The current style of the monarch of Solomon Islands is: "Charles the Third, by the Grace of God, King of Solomon Islands and His other Realms and Territories, Head of the Commonwealth".

South Africa
The Royal Style and Titles Act 1953 of the Parliament of South Africa granted the monarch (at the time Queen Elizabeth II) a separate title in her role as Queen of South Africa. The new style was rendered in three languages:

In English: Elizabeth II, Queen of South Africa and of Her other Realms and Territories, Head of the Commonwealth
In Afrikaans: Elizabeth II, Koningin van Suid-Afrika en van Haar ander Koninkryke en Gebiede, Hoof van die Statebond
In Latin: Elizabeth II, Africae Australis regnorumque suo rum ceterorum Regina, consortionis populorum Princeps

Tuvalu
The Royal Style and Title Act 1987 of the Tuvaluan Parliament granted the monarch (at the time Queen Elizabeth II) a separate title in her role as Queen of Tuvalu.

The current style of the Tuvaluan monarch is: Charles the Third, by the Grace of God King of Tuvalu and of His other Realms and Territories, Head of the Commonwealth.

United Kingdom

The Royal Titles Act 1901 allowed for the addition of the words "and of the British Dominions beyond the Seas" to the monarch's title.

The Royal and Parliamentary Titles Act 1927 was amended in 1948 by the Indian Independence Act 1947 so as to omit the words Emperor of India from the monarch's title in the United Kingdom. King George VI's title became: George VI by the Grace of God of Great Britain, Ireland and the British Dominions beyond the Seas King, Defender of the Faith.

The Royal Titles Act 1953 specified that it applied only to the United Kingdom and those overseas territories whose foreign relations were controlled by the UK. The legislation tidied up the use of the title King of Ireland, following Ireland's transition to a republic in 1949.

As authorised by the Act, Elizabeth proclaimed that her title in the United Kingdom would be, equivalently in English and (for the first time) in Latin: "Elizabeth II, by the Grace of God of the United Kingdom of Great Britain and Northern Ireland and of Her other Realms and Territories Queen, Head of the Commonwealth, Defender of the Faith" and Elizabeth II, Dei Gratia Britanniarum Regnorumque Suorum Ceterorum Regina, Consortionis Populorum Princeps, Fidei Defensor.

The title of the Sovereign in the United Kingdom is: "Charles the Third, by the Grace of God of the United Kingdom of Great Britain and Northern Ireland and of His other Realms and Territories, King, Head of the Commonwealth, Defender of the Faith"

And in Latin: "Carolus III, Dei Gratia Britanniarum Regnorumque Suorum Ceterorum Rex, Consortionis Populorum Princeps, Fidei Defensor"

See also
List of titles and honours of Queen Elizabeth II
Royal Titles Act 1876 (United Kingdom)
Royal Titles Act 1974 (New Zealand)

References

External links

 Royal Titles Act 1953, c 9 (United Kingdom)
 An Act Relating to the Royal Style and Titles 1953 (Australia)
 Royal Style and Titles Act 1973 (Australia) from Federal Register of Legislation. Retrieved 7 May 2017.
 Royal Style and Titles Act 1973 (South Australia)
 Royal Style and Titles Act 1985 (Canada)
 Act 6 of 1953 "Royal Style and Titles Act, 1953 (South Africa) from the Union of South Africa Government Gazette Extraordinary, vol. CLXXI, 4 March 1953, pages 12-13 - official titles in Latin, English, and Afrikaans (prior to declaration of republic in 1961)

British Empire
British monarchy
Commonwealth royal styles